Maltese identity cards are issued to Maltese citizens and other lawful residents of Malta. They can be used as a travel document when visiting countries in the European Union and the European Economic Area.

They can also be used instead of a Maltese passport to visit French overseas territories , Greenland (de facto), Georgia, Montserrat (for max. 14 days) and Turkey.

In August 2020, new electronic ID cards conforming to new EU standards under Regulation 2019/1157 began to be issued. Sample images of these new ID cards can be found at this link: sample_IDCard_Doc.jpg

See also
 National identity cards in the European Union

References

Malta